Philippe Alliot (born 27 July 1954) is a former racing driver who participated in Formula One from  to  and from  to . He raced for RAM, Ligier, Larrousse and McLaren.

Early career
Prior to his career in Formula One he competed during 1976 and 1977 in Formule Renault, and won the championship in 1978, in the BP Racing team. With said team he also won the French Formula Renault championship and went on to French Formula Three. He finished third in his first race and moved to the European Formula 3 Championship in 1980. By 1983 he moved to Formula Two but hit the headlines that year when he finished third in the Le Mans 24 Hours with Michael and Mario Andretti in a Kremer Porsche.

Formula One
In 1984 Alliot joined the Skoal Bandit RAM F1 team, but did not enjoy much in the way of success. After Jacques Laffite was injured at the 1986 British Grand Prix, Alliot took his place at Ligier, where he showed an improvement. He moved to Larrousse for 1987, but returned to Ligier in 1990, gaining a reputation for accidents. This led to heavy criticism from team members, other drivers and even sports commentators, such as James Hunt calling Alliot "one of the worst Grand Prix drivers ever to drive a Grand Prix car". He has the record of most race starts without any lead lap finish.

Sportscars
Alliot left F1 for sports car racing in the early 1990s and enjoyed considerable success with the Peugeot team, run by Jean Todt. This included third-place finishes at the 1992 and 1993 24 Hours of Le Mans.

Return to Formula One
Alliot made another attempt at F1 with Larrousse in 1993, achieving the best finish of his F1 career, fifth, at the San Marino Grand Prix. The following year, he undertook a testing role with McLaren due to the Peugeot connection factor. This role led to a race at the 1994 Hungarian Grand Prix for the team as a replacement for Mika Häkkinen, while he was suspended. Qualifying 14th, he retired from the race itself. Alliot then replaced Olivier Beretta at Larrousse for the following race, the Belgian Grand Prix. Starting from 19th on the grid, he retired with engine failure and this proved to be his last race in F1. Alliot left Formula One as the driver with the most race starts who had never achieved at least one of a podium finish, a pole position, or a fastest lap.

Later life
After announcing his retirement from Formula One in 1995, he decided to try a career in politics, also did some TV commentary and competed in ice racing and the Paris–Dakar Rally, but ended running his own GT racing team.

Racing record

Career summary

† As Alliot was a guest driver, he was ineligible for championship points.

Complete European Formula Three results
(key) (Races in bold indicate pole position) (Races 
in italics indicate fastest lap)

24 Hours of Le Mans results

Complete European Formula Two Championship results
(key) (Races in bold indicate pole position; races in italics indicate fastest lap)

Complete International Formula 3000 results
(key) (Races in bold indicate pole position) (Races in italics indicate fastest lap)

Complete Formula One World Championship results
(key)

References

Driver Database entry for Philippe Alliot

1954 births
Living people
24 Hours of Le Mans drivers
24 Hours of Spa drivers
Dakar Rally drivers
European Formula Two Championship drivers
French Formula Renault 2.0 drivers
French Formula One drivers
French racing drivers
International Formula 3000 drivers
Larrousse Formula One drivers
Ligier Formula One drivers
McLaren Formula One drivers
RAM Racing Formula One drivers
World Sportscar Championship drivers
Trans-Am Series drivers
Peugeot Sport drivers
BMW M drivers
Oreca drivers
Team Joest drivers
TOM'S drivers